Soul Coughing was an American alternative rock band composed of vocalist/guitarist Mike Doughty (also known as M. Doughty), keyboardist/sampler Mark Degli Antoni, bassist Sebastian Steinberg, and drummer Yuval Gabay. Soul Coughing developed a devout fanbase and garnered largely positive response from critics. Steve Huey of AllMusic described the band as "one of the most unusual cult bands of the 1990s... driven by frontman Mike Doughty's stream-of-consciousness poetry. Soul Coughing's sound was a willfully idiosyncratic mix of improvisational jazz grooves, oddball samples, hip hop, electronics, and noisy experimentalism". Doughty himself described the band's sound as "deep slacker jazz". The group broke up in 2000.

Recording career 
All four Soul Coughing members were regulars at The Knitting Factory, a New York City nightclub and performance venue that was part of the 1980s and 1990s experimental downtown scene. Doughty was a doorman known for his improvized comedic quasi-raps, while the others appeared at the Knitting Factory in various bands. Doughty, Degli Antoni, and Steinberg all performed in versions of John Zorn's composition Cobra, appearing on John Zorn's Cobra: Live at the Knitting Factory (recorded 1992, released 1995).

Within a year of its formation, the band was signed to Slash Records, a subsidiary of Warner Bros. Records. The group released three albums: Ruby Vroom (1994), Irresistible Bliss (1996) and El Oso (1998), with the latter showing a marked drum and bass influence. Irresistible Bliss and El Oso both reached the Billboard 200 albums chart. The band enjoyed minor hit singles with "Soundtrack to Mary" and "Super Bon Bon".

In 1996, Soul Coughing contributed to the AIDS benefit album Offbeat: A Red Hot Soundtrip, produced by the Red Hot Organization. Also in 1996, one of the group's songs, "Unmarked Helicopters", was included in the Songs in the Key of X: Music from and Inspired by the X-Files. The band also placed songs in the soundtracks to the films Batman & Robin ("The Bug"), Tommy Boy ("Is Chicago, Is Not Chicago") and Spawn ("A Plane Scraped It’s Belly On A Sooty Yellow Moon", featuring. Roni Size). Their song "Super Bon Bon" was included on the soundtrack for the video games Gran Turismo 2 in 1999 and The Bigs 2 in 2009.

The song "Circles" from El Oso reached #8 on the Billboard Alternative Songs chart, and was used as the soundtrack to a Cartoon Network extended commercial that poked fun at repeating cartoon backgrounds.

Soul Coughing broke up in 2000. Mark Degli Antoni moved on to a career as a film score composer, while Mike Doughty began a prolific solo career, occasionally revisiting Soul Coughing songs in new styles.

Lust in Phaze, a greatest hits compilation including a few B-sides, was released in 2002. Rhino Records reissued Soul Coughing's three studio albums on 180-gram black vinyl in 2015, marking the first time Ruby Vroom had been pressed to vinyl. In 2017, Swedish record label Woah Dad! acquired Soul Coughing's back catalog from Slash Records.

Soul Coughing was honored with a star on the outside mural of Minneapolis nightclub First Avenue, which recognizes performers who have played sold-out shows or otherwise made major cultural contributions to the iconic venue. Receiving a star "might be the most prestigious public honor an artist can receive in Minneapolis", according to journalist Steve Marsh. Soul Coughing was especially popular in Minneapolis, thanks to airplay on alternative radio station Rev 105, and regularly performed there to audiences five to ten times larger than in other cities.

Discography

Albums

Compilations

Live albums

Singles

References

External links 
Soul Coughing Underground – An unofficial website including a discography, guitar tablature, and other information
website of Mike Doughty
Doughty's Patreon
website of Mark Degli Antoni
Soul Coughing collection at the Internet Archive's live music archive
Suckerfied Assman Tripping In His Own Dribble: An Appreciation of Soul Coughing (No Ripcord feature)

1992 establishments in New York City
2000 disestablishments in New York (state)
Alternative rock groups from New York (state)
Musical groups disestablished in 2000
Musical groups established in 1992
Musical groups from New York City
Slash Records artists